Plexippoides is a genus of jumping spiders that was first described by Jerzy Prószyński in 1984. The name means "having the likeness of Plexippus"

Species
 it contains twenty-six species, found in eastern Asia, though some are recorded from Africa and south-eastern Europe:
Plexippoides annulipedis (Saito, 1939) – China, Korea, Japan
Plexippoides arkit Logunov & Rakov, 1998 – Central Asia
Plexippoides biprocessiger (Lessert, 1927) – Congo
Plexippoides cornutus Xie & Peng, 1993 – China
Plexippoides digitatus Peng & Li, 2002 – China
Plexippoides dilucidus Próchniewicz, 1990 – Bhutan
Plexippoides discifer (Schenkel, 1953) – China
Plexippoides doenitzi (Karsch, 1879) – China, Korea, Japan
Plexippoides flavescens (O. Pickard-Cambridge, 1872) (type) – Sudan, Egypt, Middle East, Iran, Kyrgyzstan, Turkmenistan, Afghanistan. Introduced to Ukraine
Plexippoides gestroi (Dalmas, 1920) – Greece, Cyprus, Turkey, Azerbaijan, Syria, Iraq, Iran
Plexippoides guangxi (Peng & Li, 2002) – China
Plexippoides insperatus Logunov, 2021 – Iran, Pakistan
Plexippoides jinlini Yang, Zhu & Song, 2006 – China
Plexippoides longapophysis Wang, Mi & Peng, 2020 – China
Plexippoides longus Zhu, Zhang, Zhang & Chen, 2005 – China
Plexippoides meniscatus Yang, Zhu & Song, 2006 – China
Plexippoides nishitakensis (Strand, 1907) – Japan
Plexippoides potanini Prószyński, 1984 – China
Plexippoides regius Wesolowska, 1981 – Russia, China, Korea
Plexippoides regiusoides Peng & Li, 2008 – China
Plexippoides subtristis Wang, Mi & Peng, 2020 – China
Plexippoides szechuanensis Logunov, 1993 – China
Plexippoides tangi Wang, Mi & Peng, 2020 – China
Plexippoides tristis Próchniewicz, 1990 – Nepal
Plexippoides validus Xie & Yin, 1991 – China
Plexippoides zhangi Peng, Yin, Yan & Kim, 1998 – China

References

External links
 Photograph of P. gestroi

Spiders of Europe
Salticidae
Salticidae genera
Spiders of Africa
Spiders of Asia